Bomber or The Bomber, as a nickname, may refer to the following people:

Chris Bombolas (born 1960), former Australian politician and sports journalist
Martyn "Bomber" Bradbury (born 1974), left-wing New Zealand media commentator and radio and TV host
George Brown (footballer born 1903) (1903–1948), English football player and manager
John Brown (footballer, born 1962), Scottish football player and manager
Tony Brown (footballer, born 1945) (born 1945)
Bernard Chanda (1952–1993), Zambian footballer nicknamed "the Bomber"
Sir Arthur Harris, 1st Baronet (1892–1984), air chief marshal of the Royal Air Force known as "Bomber Harris"
Chris Harris (speedway rider) (born 1982)
Tommy Harris (rugby) (1927–2006), Welsh rugby league footballer
Eoin Liston (born 1957), Irish Gaelic footballer
Joseph Mermans (1922–1996), Belgian footballer nicknamed "The Bomber"
Gerd Müller (1945–2021), German footballer nicknamed "Der Bomber der Nation"
Yuji Nakazawa (born 1978), Japanese footballer
John Peard (born 1945), Australian former rugby league footballer and coach
Hamdi Salihi (born 1984), Albanian footballer nicknamed "The Bomber"
Kevin Sheldon (born 1956), English former footballer
Mark Thompson (footballer) (born 1963), former Australian rules footballer known as "Bomber Thompson"
Maurice Van Robays (1914–1965), American Major League Baseball player

See also

Charlie Conacher (1909–1967), Canadian National Hockey League player nicknamed "The Big Bomber"
Daryle Lamonica (born 1941), American Football League and National Football League quarterback nicknamed "The Mad Bomber"
Joe Louis (1914–1981), African-American boxer and heavyweight world champion nicknamed "The Brown Bomber"
 
 

Lists of people by nickname